Harold Skeete (13 December 1892 – 18 August 1972) was a Barbadian cricketer. He played in two first-class matches for the Barbados cricket team in 1924/25 and 1928/29.

See also
 List of Barbadian representative cricketers

References

External links
 

1892 births
1972 deaths
Barbadian cricketers
Barbados cricketers
People from Christ Church, Barbados